The 2022 Americana Music Honors & Awards ceremony was held on Wednesday, September 14, 2022, at Ryman Auditorium the in Nashville, Tennessee. The marquee event for the Americana Music Association, artists are awarded for outstanding achievements in the music industry.

Performers

Winners and nominees 
The eligibility period for the 21st Americana Music Honors & Awards is April 1, 2021 to March 31, 2022. The nominees were announced on May 16, 2022 by The War and Treaty at the annual Nominations Ceremony, which was held at the National Museum of African American Music, which featured performances by Adia Victoria and Fisk Jubilee Singers and was livestreamed on Facebook. Winners in Bold.

Honors 
The 2022 Lifetime Achievement honorees were announced on August 23, 2022.

Free Speech Award/Inspiration Award 

 Indigo Girls

Legacy of Americana Award 

 The Fairfield Four

Lifetime Achievement Award for Executive 

 Al Bell

Lifetime Achievement Award for Performance 

 Chris Isaak

President's Award 

 Don Williams

Lifetime Achievement Award 
 Buddy Miller

Presenters 
 The Milk Carton Kids
 Molly Tuttle
 Sarah Jarosz
 Shannon Sanders & Katie Rainge-Briggs
 Elizabeth Cook
 Buddy Miller
 Garth Fundis
 Lucius
 Nikki Lane
 Lyle Lovett
 Lukas Nelson
 Chris Cobb
 Jed Hilly
 Robert Plant
 Hayes Carll & Allison Moorer
 Michael T. Mauldin
 Ann Powers
 John Seigenthaler
 Brandi Carlile
 Jerry Douglas

References 

American music awards
2022 music awards